Bahri Kaya (born 10 June 1957) is a Turkish former football player and manager who played as a forward.

References

1957 births
Living people
Sportspeople from Trabzon
Turkish footballers
Association football forwards
Fenerbahçe S.K. footballers
Sakaryaspor footballers
Vefa S.K. footballers
Turkish football managers
Zeytinburnuspor managers
Diyarbakırspor managers
Yozgatspor managers
Adanaspor managers
Kocaelispor managers
Giresunspor managers
Orduspor managers
Boluspor managers
Şanlıurfaspor managers
Sarıyer S.K. managers